Adolf Bruno Heinrich Ernst Heusinger (4 August 1897 – 30 November 1982) was a German military officer whose career spanned the German Empire, the Weimar Republic, Nazi Germany and West Germany. He joined the German Army as a volunteer in 1915 and later became a professional soldier. He served as the Operations Chief within the general staff of the High Command of the German Army in the Wehrmacht from 1938 to 1944. He was then appointed acting Chief of the General Staff for two weeks in 1944 following Kurt Zeitzler's resignation.

Heusinger was later appointed head of the military cartography office when the war ended. He later became a general for West Germany and served as head of the West German military from 1957 to 1961 as well as Chairman of the NATO Military Committee from 1961 to 1964.

Early life and career
Heusinger was born in Holzminden, in the Duchy of Brunswick, German Empire. He entered the Prussian Army in 1915 and became an officer in 1917. After the First World War, Heusinger was retained in the Reichswehr of the Weimar Republic. In 1931, Heusinger was assigned to the operations staff of the Troop Office (Truppenamt) in the Ministry of the Reichswehr, the German Army's covert General Staff that circumvented the Treaty of Versailles, which forbade the institution. In August 1937, Heusinger was assigned to the Operations Staff of the re-established Army General Staff of Wehrmacht. He served there, was promoted to lieutenant colonel on 20 March 1939 and remained in that position until 15 October 1940, when he became its chief.

Second World War

With the outbreak of the Second World War, the German Army High Command (the OKH) assumed its wartime organisation. Heusinger accompanied the field staff and assisted in the planning of operations for the invasions of Poland, Denmark, Norway, and France and the Low Countries. He was promoted to colonel on 1 August 1940 and became chief of the Operationsabteilung in October 1940, which made him number three in the army's planning hierarchy, after the Chief of the General Staff, General Franz Halder, and the Deputy Chief of the General Staff/Chief Quartermaster, General Friedrich Paulus.

After the invasion of the Soviet Union in June 1941, the OKH became responsible primarily for planning operations in that theatre, and the Armed Forces High Command (Oberkommando der Wehrmacht, or OKW) was responsible for other theatres. Halder was replaced as Chief of the General Staff in September 1942 by General Kurt Zeitzler. Heusinger remained chief of the Operationsabteilung and was promoted to Generalleutnant on 1 January 1943. In June 1944, Zeitzler suffered a nervous breakdown and abandoned his post, and on 10 June, Heusinger temporarily assumed his office as Chief of the General Staff of the Army. In this capacity, he attended the meeting at Hitler's Wolf's Lair on 20 July 1944, and he was standing next to Hitler when the bomb exploded that had been planted by Claus von Stauffenberg.

Heusinger was hospitalised for his injuries in the explosion but was later arrested and interrogated by the Gestapo to determine his role, if any, in the 20 July plot. Although there was evidence that Heusinger had contacts with many of the conspirators, like for all other high-ranking Nazi military leaders, there was no evidence to connect him to the plot, and he was released in October 1944. According to Heusinger's own autobiography, he published an essay ("Denkschrift"), which Hitler received very positively. Heusinger made available all information that he had on the conspirators, who had plotted against the Führer. He reaffirmed that he has not participated in the assassination plot since he still felt an obligation to fulfil his duty as a soldier of the German Reich despite his personal view that the war had been lost. After his release, he was placed into the Führerreserve, a reserve army of high-ranking Nazi military leaders awaiting assignments, and was not assigned to another position until 25 March 1945, when he was made chief of armed forces mapping department (Chef Wehrmacht-Kartenwesen). He was later taken prisoner by the Western Allies in May 1945.

Postwar
An internee from 1945 to 1947, Heusinger testified during the Nuremberg Trials.

In 1950, he became an advisor on military matters to Konrad Adenauer, the first Chancellor of West Germany. He served in the Blank Office Amt Blank, the office headed by Theodor Blank, which became the West German Ministry of Defense in 1955.

With the establishment of the West Germany Armed Forces Bundeswehr in 1955, Heusinger returned to military service. He was appointed a Generalleutnant (lieutenant general) on 12 November 1955, in the Bundeswehr and chairman of the Military Leadership Council (Militärischer Führungsrat).

In March 1957, he succeeded Hans Speidel as chief of the all-armed forces department (Chef der Abteilung Gesamtstreitkräfte).

Shortly thereafter, in June 1957, Heusinger was promoted to full general and named the first Inspector General of the Bundeswehr (Generalinspekteur der Bundeswehr), and he served in that capacity until March 1961. In April 1961, he was appointed Chairman of the NATO Military Committee in Washington, DC, where he served until 1964 when he retired. He was, according to news reports, wanted by the Soviet Union in the early 1960s for war crimes committed in the occupied Soviet territories.

Heusinger died in Cologne on 30 November 1982, aged 85.

According to documents released by the German Federal Intelligence Service in 2014, Heusinger may have been part of the Schnez-Truppe, a secret army that veterans of the Wehrmacht and Waffen-SS sought to establish in the early 1950s.

Awards and decorations
 Iron Cross (1914) 1st and 2nd Class
 Wound Badge 1918 in Black
 Iron Cross (1939) 1st and 2nd Class
 Princely Reuss Honour Cross 3rd Class with Swords
 Princely Reuss Silver Merit Medal with Swords
 War Merit Cross 2nd Class (Brunswick)
 Honour Cross of the World War 1914/1918 (First World War service medal)
 Wound Badge of 20 July 1944 in silver
 War Merit Cross (1939), 1st and 2nd Class with Swords
 Wehrmacht Long Service Award, 2nd Class
 Large Merit Cross of the Merit Order of the Federal Republic of Germany with Star and Sash
 Commander of the United States Legion of Merit
 Commander's Cross of the Order of the Crown of Italy
 Commander's Cross of the Order of Merit of Hungary
 Order of the Cross of Liberty 1st Class with Swords (Finland)

References

Sources

External links
Biography on BMVg website
 http://www.dhm.de/lemo/html/biografien/HeusingerAdolf/
Adolf Heusinger - CIA: CIA's file on Heusinger, released under the Nazi War Crimes Disclosure Act. The document shows that Heusinger initialled the Commissar Order and Commando Order, but, due to his cooperative attitude, no further action was taken.

1897 births
1982 deaths
People from Holzminden
Lieutenant generals of the Luftwaffe
Bundeswehr generals
Inspectors General of the Bundeswehr
German Army personnel of World War I
Commanders of the Legion of Merit
Commander's Crosses with Star of the Order of Merit of the Republic of Hungary (military)
Grand Crosses with Star and Sash of the Order of Merit of the Federal Republic of Germany
Recipients of the clasp to the Iron Cross, 1st class
Recipients of the Order of the Cross of Liberty, 1st Class
Recipients of the War Merit Cross
NATO military personnel
Himmerod meeting participants
Generals of the German Army
Military personnel from Lower Saxony